Ligne claire (French for "clear line", ;) is a style of drawing created and pioneered by Hergé, the Belgian cartoonist and creator of The Adventures of Tintin. It uses clear strong lines sometimes of varied width and no hatching, while contrast is downplayed as well. Cast shadows are often illuminated, and the style often features strong colours and a combination of cartoonish characters against a realistic background. The name was coined by Joost Swarte in 1977.

History 
Hergé started out drawing in a much looser, rougher style which was likely influenced by American comic strip artists of the late 1920s and 1930s, such as Gluyas Williams and George McManus. However the precise lines which characterize most of his work are firmly in place early on (e.g. the colored version of The Blue Lotus (released in 1946) is based on the original black and white newspaper version from 1934–35 and not redrawn). Ligne claire was also influenced by Japan's shin-hanga style, one aspect of the Japonisme movement that swept Europe after the opening up of Japan to European influence in the 1860s.

Much of the "Brussels school" started to use this style, notably Edgar P. Jacobs, Bob de Moor, Roger Leloup, and Jacques Martin, many of whom also worked for Tintin magazine.

The ligne claire style achieved its highest popularity in the 1950s, but its influence started to wane in the 1960s and was seen as old-fashioned by the new generation of comic book artists. In the late 1970s, it experienced a resurgence of interest, largely due to Dutch artists like Joost Swarte and Theo van den Boogaard, who had come up through the Dutch underground comics scene, as well as the French artist Jacques Tardi. Henk Kuijpers was also successful in his application of the style.

Throughout the 1980s, Yves Chaland, Ted Benoit, Serge Clerc and Floc'h relaunched the ligne claire style in France. This incarnation was a very stylistic and artistic variation, which the artists also utilized for illustrating posters and LP covers etc. Swarte dubbed this variant "atoomstijl" ("atomic style").

Contemporary use of the ligne claire is often ironic or post-modern. For example, Van den Boogaard used the simple, clear style to set up a conflict with the amorality of his characters, while Tardi used it in his Adèle Blanc-Sec series to create a nostalgic atmosphere which is then ruthlessly undercut by the story. A recent serious clear line artist is the Dutchman Peter van Dongen, who created the Rampokan series about the Dutch colonisation of Indonesia.

Ligne claire is not confined to Franco-Belgian comics. It has also been popular with Italian artists such as Vittorio Giardino, Spanish artists such as Paco Roca and Francesc Capdevila Gisbert ("Max"), British artists such as Martin Handford, Bryan Talbot and Garen Ewing, Norwegian artists such as Jason, American artists such as Chris Ware, Geof Darrow, Jason Lutes, and Jason Little, and Italian-Australian artists such as Ilya Milstein.

In 2022, the first monograph entirely dedicated to the clear line (The Clear Line in Comics and Cinema: A Transmedial Approach, by Portuguese scholar David Pinho Barros), was published by Leuven University Press in the collection "Studies in European Comics and Graphic Novels".

Notable ligne claire books/series

Hergé 
The Adventures of Tintin
Jo, Zette and Jocko
Quick and Flupke

Others 
Jommeke – Jef Nys
The Adventures of Freddy Lombard – Yves Chaland
Alix – Jacques Martin
 Barelli – Bob de Moor
 Berlin – Jason Lutes
 Bingo Bongo et son Combo Congolais – Ted Benoît
Blake and Mortimer – Edgar P. Jacobs
César and Jessica
Franka – Henk Kuijpers
 Hector and Dexter (a.k.a. Coton et Piston and Katoen en Pinbal) – Joost Swarte
Julian Opie's Portraits – Julian Opie
Kurt Dunder
Le Monde d'Edena – Moebius
 Nofret – Sussi Bech
 Professor Palmboom – Dick Briel
The Rainbow Orchid – Garen Ewing
Jimmy Corrigan, the Smartest Kid on Earth – Chris Ware
 Shutterbug Follies – Jason Little
Spike and Suzy (a.k.a. Bob and Bobette, Willy and Wanda, and Suske en Wiske) – Willy Vandersteen
 Tintin pastiches – Yves Rodier
 Where's Wally? – Martin Handford
Yoko Tsuno – Roger Leloup
How to Understand Israel in 60 Days or Less – Sarah Glidden
Sjef van Oekel – Theo van den Boogaard
The Property – Rutu Modan
Les Cités obscures – François Schuiten
Taylor Zander and the Wendigo Murders - Michael Francis

See also
Franco-Belgian comics
Marcinelle school – a contemporary, contrasting style

References

External links

Klare lijn international – News on ligne claire comics (in French)
Hergé & The Clear Line: Part 1

1977 neologisms
Comics terminology
Bandes dessinées
Belgian comics
Belgian inventions
Hergé
Style
Japonisme